Dan Birdwell was an American college and professional football player.  A defensive lineman, he played collegiately for the University of Houston and professionally for the Oakland Raiders of the American Football League (AFL) from 1962 to 1969.  He was the starting left defensive tackle with Tom Keating (American football) on the right side for the 1967 AFL Champion Raiders with their 13-1 win–loss record and on the losing side in the second AFL-NFL World Championship game. In that season, the front four of  Birdwell, Keating, Ike Lassiter, and Ben Davidson combined for impressive totals of 67 sacks and 666 yards lost.

Birdwell is credited with the following quote regarding the necessary mindset to play professional football:  "You have to play this game like somebody just hit your mother with a two by four."

Birdwell died of a massive heart attack at age 37 on February 14, 1978.

See also
List of American Football League players

References

1978 deaths
Houston Cougars football players
Oakland Raiders players
American Football League All-Star players
1940 births
American Football League players